Acanthocalycium spiniflorum is a species of flowering plant in the cactus family Cactaceae from Argentina.

It produces many spines and, in summer, trumpet-shaped flowers which may be purple, pink or white.

Under its synonym Echinopsis spiniflora this plant has won the Royal Horticultural Society's Award of Garden Merit.

References

External links
 
 

spiniflorum
Flora of Argentina